The Gotha LD 5 (for Land Doppeldecker - "Land Biplane") was a military aircraft produced in Germany during the early part of World War I.

Development
Developed to the Kavallerie Flugzeug requirement for light fast scouting aircraft, the LD 5 was used for training and reconnaissance, it was a conventional design with two-bay unstaggered wings, tailskid landing gear, and a single open cockpit. Flight tests showed it to be unable to live up to intended reconnaissance duties and so the LD 5 was relegated to being a trainer. The LD 5's short wings also rendered it confined to long runways, but the LD 5 was ordered into modest production despite deficiencies.

Operators

Luftstreitkrafte

Specifications (LD 5)

See also

References

Further reading

 

1910s German military utility aircraft
LD.5
Biplanes
Rotary-engined aircraft
Aircraft first flown in 1914
Single-engined tractor aircraft